My 45 may refer to:

Television stations
KUTP, Phoenix, Arizona (O&O)
KSHV-TV, Shreveport, Louisiana
KUVI-DT, Bakersfield, California

Music
"My 45", a song from the album Dirt Don't Hurt by Holly Golightly and the Brokeoffs